Sundown is the debut album by Los Angeles cowpunk band Rank and File, released in 1982 on Slash Records.

Critical reception
Critic Robert Christgau gave it an "A−" in his Consumer Guide, while Trouser Press called the album "effortlessly enjoyable," citing its "tuneful and tasty pop numbers, which also benefit from pretty harmonies and confident playing." It was voted one of the best albums of the year in the Village Voice'''s influential Pazz & Jop critics poll.

Reissues
In 2003, Rhino Handmade, an imprint of Rhino Entertainment, compiled Sundown, the band's second album, Long Gone Dead, and bonus tracks on a CD entitled The Slash Years.

On its own, Sundown was reissued on CD in 2005 by Collectors' Choice Music.

Again on its own, Sundown'' was reissued on vinyl by Drastic Plastic Records in 2020.

Track listing
All songs by Chip Kinman and Tony Kinman except as indicated.

Side one
Amanda Ruth (3:10)
(Glad I'm) Not In Love (2:29)
Rank and File (Alejandro Escovedo, Kinman, Session, Miller) (4:52)
The Conductor Wore Black (3:33)

Side two
Sundown (3:04)
I Went Walking (2:57)
Lucky Day (3:42)
I Don't Go Out Much Anymore (2:17)
Coyote (5:05)

Personnel
Chip Kinman - guitar, vocals, harmonica
Tony Kinman - bass, vocals
Slim Evans - drums
Alejandro Escovedo - guitar, vocals

References

1982 debut albums
Rank and File (band) albums
Albums produced by David Kahne
Slash Records albums